The Last Supper (aka Come Tomorrow) is a 2003 South Korean film directed by Son Yeong-guk.

The film is about three people on the verge of ending their lives—a malpracticing doctor just released from prison, a young woman with debt problems and a terminal illness, and a gangster on the run from a rival gang—who meet each other by chance and start to turn their fortunes around.

Cast 
 Kim Bo-seong ... So-ju
 Jo Yoon-hee ... Jae-rim
 Lee Jong-won ... Gong-bong

Release 
The Last Supper was released in South Korea on 14 November 2003, receiving a total of 9,863 admissions in Seoul.

References

External links 
 
 The Last Supper at the Korean Movie Database

2003 films
2003 comedy films
Medical-themed films
2000s Korean-language films
South Korean comedy films
2000s South Korean films